Circle High School can refer to

Circle High School (Towanda, Kansas) a public high school in Towanda, Kansas
Circle High School (Circle, Montana) a Public High School in Circle, Montana

Educational institution disambiguation pages